Cramock Burn is an historic -long watercourse in Scone, Perth and Kinross, Scotland. It is a tributary of the River Tay, which it joins just north of where the River Almond flows into the Tay, on the Perth side of the river. On an 1804 estate map, it is described as a "small sluggish stream".

Course 
The burn is sourced from a spring just north of New Scone and northeast of an area known in the early 19th century as Spoutwells. From there, it flows west and passes under an unnamed road. Turning slightly south, it passes beneath Stormontfield Road before flowing past the northern edge of Perth Racecourse. Around  later, it empties into the River Tay near Garragie Bank.

An 1886 Gardeners' Chronicle article described the burn as passing Balboughty Farm.

Flooding concern 
In 2019, concerns from residents were raised that groundwater and drainage from the Cross Tay Link Road would cause the burn to overflow.

References

External link
"Geology of the Perth and Dundee district, sheets 48W, 48E, 49. Sheet memoir (Scotland)" - Natural Environment Research Council
"Figure 6.1 - Hydrology, Hydrogeology and Soils Baseline Conditions" - Scottish & Southern

Tay catchment